Troy Wilson may refer to:
Troy Wilson (defensive back) (born 1965)
Troy Wilson (defensive lineman) (born 1970), US American footballer
Troy Wilson (Australian rules footballer) (born 1972), Australian speedway driver and ex Australian footballer